Diaphanogryllacris is a genus of Orthopterans, sometimes known as 'leaf-folding crickets' in the subfamily Hyperbaeninae and tribe Capnogryllacridini.  The recorded distribution is: the Indian subcontinent, China, Indochina, western Malesia up to Sulawesi.

Species 
The Orthoptera Species File lists:

 Diaphanogryllacris adunca Gorochov & Dawwrueng, 2015
 Diaphanogryllacris aequalis (Walker, 1859)
 Diaphanogryllacris albifrons Gorochov & Woznessenskij, 2000
 Diaphanogryllacris annamita (Griffini, 1909)
 Diaphanogryllacris annandalei (Griffini, 1914)
 Diaphanogryllacris barkudensis (Chopard, 1924)
 Diaphanogryllacris bezborodovi Gorochov & Dawwrueng, 2015
 Diaphanogryllacris brevispina Du, Bian & Shi, 2016
 Diaphanogryllacris collaris (Walker, 1869)
 Diaphanogryllacris corporaali (Willemse, 1927)
 Diaphanogryllacris dravida (Karny, 1929)
 Diaphanogryllacris foveolatis Du, Bian & Shi, 2016
 Diaphanogryllacris gladiator (Fabricius, 1793)
 Diaphanogryllacris gravelyi (Griffini, 1914)
 Diaphanogryllacris incavatis Du, Bian & Shi, 2016
 Diaphanogryllacris inflatis Du, Bian & Shi, 2016
 Diaphanogryllacris insignis Gorochov & Woznessenskij, 2000
 Diaphanogryllacris laeta (Walker, 1869)
 Diaphanogryllacris macroxiphus (Hebard, 1922)
 Diaphanogryllacris normalis Gorochov & Woznessenskij, 2000
 Diaphanogryllacris opulenta Ingrisch, 2018
 Diaphanogryllacris orlovi Gorochov & Dawwrueng, 2015
 Diaphanogryllacris panfilovi Gorochov & Woznessenskij, 2000
 Diaphanogryllacris panitvongi Gorochov, Dawwrueng & Artchawakom, 2015
 Diaphanogryllacris pellucens Gorochov & Woznessenskij, 2000
 Diaphanogryllacris postica (Walker, 1869)
 Diaphanogryllacris propria Gorochov & Woznessenskij, 2000
 Diaphanogryllacris recta Ingrisch, 2018
 Diaphanogryllacris simulator Gorochov & Woznessenskij, 2000
 Diaphanogryllacris sinuata Ingrisch, 2018
 Diaphanogryllacris tibialis (Serville, 1838)
 Diaphanogryllacris translucens (Serville, 1838)type species (as Gryllacris translucens Serville = D. translucens translucens; locality Java)
 Diaphanogryllacris trinotata (Walker, 1870)

References

External links

Ensifera genera
Gryllacrididae
Orthoptera of Indo-China
Orthoptera of Malesia